Arcadia Beach State Recreation Site is a beach and state park on the Oregon Coast of the United States located two miles south of Cannon Beach. Under the right conditions, one may hear the "singing sands" a squeaking or violin-like noise.

References

External links
 

Parks in Clatsop County, Oregon
State parks of Oregon
Beaches of Oregon
Landforms of Clatsop County, Oregon